Frank Melloul was born on 2 July 1973 in Fribourg, Switzerland. A media personality and foreign affairs specialist, Melloul was  Communications Advisor to former French Prime Minister Dominique de Villepin, as well as a Director of Strategy, Research and International Business Development at France Médias Monde (formerly known as Audiovisuel extérieur de la France), an international holding company comprising France 24, Radio France Internationale (RFI), Monte Carlo Doualiya and TV5 MONDE. Since 2013, Frank has been running the Israel-based international news channel i24NEWS.

Education
Melloul studied international law and obtained a degree in International relations at the Graduate Institute of International Studies in Geneva in 1999. He later acquired a master's degree in international relations at the Écoles des hautes études internationales et politiques (EHEI) in 2000, a Masters in Negotiation at Paris XI (2001) and became an auditor at École militaire.

Politics
Upon completing his studies, Melloul joined France's Ministry of Foreign and European Affairs in 2001 as a mission manager to the Director of Strategic Affairs, Security and Disarmament. He worked as a Diplomat on the "Crisis Management and European Security and Defense Politics" portfolio. He was then appointed director of communications and press relations at the Ministry of European Affairs, under Noelle Lenoir's leadership (2002–2003). He later worked as Deputy Spokesperson at Quai d'Orsay from 2003 to 2004 and was responsible for strategic affairs, security, disarmament, terrorism, the Middle East, North Africa and the United Nations during the Iraq crisis. In April 2004, Melloul was appointed Press and Communications Advisor to Dominique de Villepin's Ministry of Interior, Internal Security and Local Freedoms, with a special focus on international issues and the war against terrorism. Afterwards, he was named Advisor to the Prime Minister and was put in charge of Communications and Media Relations from 2005 to 2007. From March 2009 to June 2009, Melloul participated in the AfPak (Afghanistan-Pakistan) negotiations at the Ministry of Foreign and European Affairs as an Advisor to Special Representative for Afghanistan and Pakistan, Pierre Lellouche. He was then named Chief of Staff to the Secretary of State for European Affairs from June to August 2009 in order to implement the committee's roadmap. In June 2010, Melloul was tasked by UMP party Secretary-General Xavier Bertrand with the mission of broadening France's influence on the international scene. In a report he submitted on 12 October 2010, Melloul proposed a number of recommendations to improve the country's diplomatic stance.

Television

Melloul held the position of Director of Strategic and International Development at the international news channel France 24 from May 2007 to June 2008, before becoming Director of Strategy, Development and Public Affairs at the France Médias Monde holding company in July 2008 and then being appointed in February 2012 to head the Strategy, Research and International Business Development division. He continued contributing to the latter regarding strategic thinking on the influence of international French media with Alain de Pouzilhac, France Médias Monde's former CEO. Melloul also spearheaded the creation of a network of "strategists" - international media personalities who regularly meet with the BBC, Deutsche Welle, the Broadcasting Board of Governors and Radio Netherland Worldwide's strategists.

On 22 August 2012 he was a candidate for the presidency position at France Médias Monde with the CSA after Alain de Pouzilhac retired, but Marie-Christine Saragosse's candidacy was ultimately approved.

Melloul is the CEO of the international Israel based news channel i24NEWS, which began broadcasting in July 2013 in English, French and Arabic, under the leadership of Patrick Drahi.

Aerospace 
In July 2021, Frank Melloul was appointed to Board of Directors of Space IL, following the organization's announcement to launch Beresheet 2 mission, in the frame of Google Lunar X Prize contest. The spacecraft, which will be built by the IAI and funded by donations of businessmen Patrick Drahi and Morris Kahn, is scheduled to be launched to the moon in 2024.

References

Graduate Institute of International and Development Studies alumni
Swiss politicians
French civil servants
1973 births
Living people
People from Fribourg